T'akra (Quechua for "uncultivated land", also spelled Tajra) is a mountain in the Andes of Peru, about  high. It is located in the Puno Region, Lampa Province, Ocuviri District. T'akra lies southwest of Qullqa Sirka and northwest of Qillqa and Machu Kunturi.

References

Mountains of Peru
Mountains of Puno Region